Lize Broekx (born 5 April 1992) is a Belgian sprint canoeist. She competed in the women's K-1 200 metres and the K-2 500 metres  events at the 2020 Summer Olympics.

References

External links
 

1992 births
Living people
Belgian female canoeists
Canoeists at the 2020 Summer Olympics
Olympic canoeists of Belgium
European Games competitors for Belgium
Canoeists at the 2019 European Games
ICF Canoe Sprint World Championships medalists in kayak
20th-century Belgian women
21st-century Belgian women